Muhamad Tuah Iskandar Bin Jamaluddin (born 29 January 1987) is a Malaysian professional footballer who plays as a defender for Malaysia club Hanelang in the Malaysia FAM League.

Honours
Crown Prince of Johor Cup
 Winners (1): 2012

References

External links

1987 births
Living people
Malaysian footballers
Petaling Jaya Rangers F.C. players
Association football defenders